Felipe Andrés Peñaloza Yánez (born 24 October 1993) is a Chilean track and road cyclist, who currently rides for Chilean amateur team CC Chacabuco.

Major results

Track

2010
 2nd  Individual pursuit, Pan American Junior Championships
2011
 Pan American Junior Championships
3rd  Omnium
3rd  Team pursuit
2015
 3rd  Team pursuit, Pan American Championships
2018
 Pan American Championships
1st  Points race
3rd  Madison (with Antonio Cabrera)
 South American Games
1st  Madison (with Antonio Cabrera)
2nd  Team pursuit
2019
 Pan American Games
1st  Madison (with Antonio Cabrera)
3rd  Team pursuit
2021
 Pan American Championships
2nd  Points race
3rd  Madison (with Antonio Cabrera)
 3rd Madison (with Antonio Cabrera), Cali, UCI Nations Cup
2022
 2022 Bolivarian Games
2nd  Omnium
3rd  Madison (with Antonio Cabrera)
 2nd  Madison (with Cristián Arriagada), South American Games

Road
2011
 2nd Time trial, National Junior Road Championships
2019
 1st  Road race, National Road Championships
2020
 1st Stage 2 
 1st Stage 3 Vuelta de la Leche

References

External links
 

1993 births
Living people
Chilean track cyclists
Chilean male cyclists
Sportspeople from Santiago
Cyclists at the 2019 Pan American Games
Pan American Games medalists in cycling
Pan American Games silver medalists for Chile
Pan American Games bronze medalists for Chile
Medalists at the 2019 Pan American Games
20th-century Chilean people
21st-century Chilean people
South American Games medalists in cycling
South American Games gold medalists for Chile
South American Games silver medalists for Chile